David Metzger (born in 1960 in Corvallis, Oregon) is an American orchestrator and composer who has orchestrated many Disney feature animation films, including Frozen, Moana, Planes, Wreck-It Ralph, Tarzan, Haunted Mansion, and Brother Bear.  In addition to his work for Disney, he has done orchestrations for over 50 major films, composed the musical scores for Tarzan 2, Brother Bear 2, and Tarzan and Jane, and has numerous video game, theme park, television, and commercial credits, as well as co-arranging and orchestrating "When You Wish Upon a Star" for the 2006 Walt Disney Pictures logo, written and composed by Mark Mancina.

Metzger received a Tony and a Drama Desk nomination in 1998 for his orchestration of Broadway musical The Lion King. He won a DVDX award for best original score in a DVD premiere movie for Tarzan 2 in 2006.

He has orchestrated the Broadway musical Frozen and is also orchestrating the musical August Rush.

Metzger grew up in Corvallis, Oregon.  He received his Bachelor of Music in Commercial Music from California State University, Long Beach.  He also did graduate work at UCLA.  He began composing for choir and jazz band in junior high school.  In his young adult years, he wrote many  jazz band charts that are still played today.  He was the arranger for jazz trumpeter Maynard Ferguson in the late 1980s.  From 1992 to 1997, he was the arranger for The Tonight Show with Jay Leno.

He has a longtime collaboration with Grammy award-winning film composer Mark Mancina.  More recently he has also worked with other notable Hollywood and Broadway composers including Robert Lopez, John Powell, Alan Silvestri, Christophe Beck, and others.

He currently lives in Oregon with his wife.  He has two grown sons.

Discography

Film Orchestrations

1990s

2000s

2010s

Broadway Orchestrations

Film and TV Composer

Video Games
Sorcery (2012). Arranger, additional music. Sony Computer Entertainment 
Call of Duty: Modern Warfare 2 (2009). Additional music, 3 levels. Activision

Miscellaneous
Disney Castle Logo. Orchestrator and Arranger. Disney, 2006.

References

External links

1960 births
20th-century American composers
21st-century American composers
American film score composers
American male film score composers
California State University, Long Beach alumni
Living people
Musicians from Corvallis, Oregon